Sandra B. Zellmer is an American lawyer currently the Robert B. Daugherty Professor of Law at University of Nebraska–Lincoln College of Law and formerly holding the Hevelone Research Chair (2006-2007) and McCollum Research Chair (2008-2009).

References

Year of birth missing (living people)
Living people
University of Nebraska faculty
American lawyers
Place of birth missing (living people)